Douce may refer to:

People
Douce I, Countess of Provence (c. 1090–1127)
Douce II, Countess of Provence (died 1172)
Francis Douce (1757–1834), English antiquary

Rivers
Douce River (Dominica)
Douce River (Grenada)

Other
Douce noir, French wine grape that is also known as Charbono in California and Bonarda in Argentina
Douce (film), a 1943 French film